Roberto Rodrigues Passos (born 12 March 1939) is a Brazilian former footballer. He played for Flamengo Rio de Janeiro between 1958 and 1962 making 67 appearances and scoring 15 goals. He also had 8 caps for the Brazil national football team, scoring 5 goals, and represented them at the  1959 Pan American Games, where the team won the silver medal.

References

1939 births
Living people
Association football forwards
Brazilian footballers
CR Flamengo footballers
Footballers from Rio de Janeiro (city)
Pan American Games medalists in football
Pan American Games silver medalists for Brazil
Footballers at the 1959 Pan American Games
Medalists at the 1959 Pan American Games